The equal detour point is a triangle center with the Kimberling number X(176). It is characterized by the equal detour property, that is if you travel from any vertex of a triangle  to another by taking a detour through some inner point  then the additional distance travelled is constant. This means the following equation has to hold:

The equal detour point is the only point with the equal detour property if and only if the following inequality holds for the angles  of the triangle :

If the inequality does not hold, then the isoperimetric point possesses the equal detour property as well.

The equal detour point, isoperimetric point, the incenter and the Gergonne point of a triangle are collinear, that is all four points lie on a common line. Furthermore, they form an harmonic range as well (see graphic on the right).

The equal detour point is the center of the inner Soddy circle of a triangle and the additional distance travelled by the detour is equal to the diameter of the inner Soddy Circle.

The barycentric coordinates of the equal detour point are

and the trilinear coordinates

References

External links 

isoperimetric and equal detour points – interaktive Illustration auf Geogebratube

Triangle centers